Harry Louis Sorensen (March 27, 1914 – April 28, 1991) was an American professional basketball player. He played for the Akron Firestone Non-Skids in the National Basketball League for two seasons and averaged 1.6 points per game.

Sorensen served in the Army in World War II. He then worked for Firestone in Ravenna, Ohio before the company transferred him to Decatur, Illinois, where he was employed until retirement in 1976.

References

1914 births
1991 deaths
Akron Firestone Non-Skids players
American men's basketball players
United States Army personnel of World War II
Basketball players from Nebraska
Centers (basketball)
Forwards (basketball)
Nebraska Cornhuskers men's basketball players
People from Nuckolls County, Nebraska
People from Ravenna, Ohio
Sportspeople from Decatur, Illinois
Military personnel from Nebraska